Herman Willem Daendels (21 October 1762 – 2 May 1818) was a Dutch revolutionary, general and politician who served as the 36th Governor General of the Dutch East Indies between 1808 and 1811.

Early life
Born in Hattem, Netherlands, on 21 October 1762, Daendels was the son of Burchard Johan Daendels, the mayoral secretary, and Josina Christina Tulleken. He studied law at the University of Harderwijk, acquiring his doctorate on 10 April 1783.

Political activity

In 1785, Daendels sided with the Patriots, who had seized power in several Dutch cities. In September 1786, he defended the city of Hattem against stadholderian troops. In September 1787, he defended Amsterdam against the Prussian army that invaded the Netherlands to restore William V of Orange. After William V had his power restored, Daendels fled to Pas-de-Calais because of a death sentence due to the defeat of the Patriots. He was a close witness to the French Revolution.

Daendels returned to the Netherlands in 1794 as a general in the French revolutionary army of general Charles Pichegru and commander of the Batavian Legion. He helped unitarian politician Pieter Vreede to power in a coup d'état on 25 January 1798. The group behind Vreede was dissatisfied with the conservative-moderate majority in parliament, which tried to prevent the formulation of a more democratic, centralistic constitution. Vreede's rule did not bring the expected results, however, and Daendels supported another coup d'état against Vreede on 14 June 1798. In the Batavian Republic he occupied several political offices, but had to step down when he failed to prevent the Anglo-Russian invasion of Holland in 1799. Daendels later engaged in farming in Heerde, Gelderland.

Military and colonial career

Governor-general of the Dutch East Indies

Louis Bonaparte made Daendels colonel-general in 1806 and Governor-general of the Dutch East Indies in 1807. After a long voyage, he arrived in the city of Batavia (now Jakarta) on 5 January 1808 and relieved the former Governor General, Albertus Henricus Wiese. His primary task was to rid the island of Java of the British Army.

He built new hospitals and military barracks, a new arms factories in Surabaya and Semarang, and a new military college in Batavia. He demolished the Castle in Batavia and replaced it with a new fort at Meester Cornelis (Jatinegara), and built Fort Lodewijk (Fort Ludwig) in Surabaya. He also moved the central government from Old Batavia to Weltevreden, with a palace built in Paradeplaats. However, his best-known achievement was the construction of the Great Post Road across northern Java from Anyer to Panarukan. The road now serves as the main road in the island of Java, called Jalur Pantura. The thousand-kilometre road was completed in only one year, during which thousands of Javanese forced laborers died.

He displayed a firm attitude towards the Javanese rulers, with the result that the rulers were willing to work with the British against the Dutch. He also subjected the population of Java to forced labour (Rodi). There were some rebellious actions against this, such as those in Cadas Pangeran, West Java.

There is considerable debate as to whether he increased the efficiency of the local bureaucracy and reduced corruption, although he certainly enriched himself during this period.

Daendels failed to stop the British invasion of the Spice Islands in 1810 despite improving the defences.

General in Napoleon's Grande Armée

When the Kingdom of Holland was incorporated into France in 1810, Daendels returned to Holland. In November 1811 he lived in Paris. He was appointed a divisional general (major general) and commanded the 26th Division of the Grande Armée, which was formed of troops from Baden, Hesse-Darmstadt, and Berg. Mid March 1812 he seems to have been appointed as commander of the 26th division  and served as part of IX Corps under Marshal Victor, which was intended as a reserve. In August Victor was told to assist and to march the East according to the Badeners in the Russian campaign in 1812. On 8 and 15 September Daendels arrived in Vilnius, then in Minsk. On 11 October this division went to Babinovichi. On 20 October he was ordered to go to Vitebsk and on 27 October they occupied nearby Beshankovichy. The temperatures dropped below zero on the next day. The supplies in Vitebsk were lost when the Russian army captured the city. On 29 October it began to snow. On 11 November the rearguard with Daendels arrived in Chashniki, about 90 km SW. On 14 November in the battle of Smoliani the French lost 3,000 men against General Peter Wittgenstein; about 1.5 meter of snow fell on that day. Four days later the supplies in Minsk were lost when Pavel Chichagov captured the city. On 24 November he was jostled by Russians but succeeded to join the rest of the French army near Bobr. All the French corpses went on to Borisov where a strategic bridge to cross the Berezina was destroyed by the Russian army. Daendels' division of 4,000 men was involved in the Battle of Berezina and seems to have been decisive. Polish forces under general Daendels defended the Modlin Fortress (NW of Warsaw) from February 1813 until December 1813. It was the last of the French fortresses along the Vistula to capitulate.

Governor-general of the Dutch Gold Coast
After the fall of Napoleon, king William I and the new Dutch government feared that Daendels could become an influential and powerful opposition leader and effectively banned him from the Netherlands by appointing him Governor-general of the Dutch Gold Coast (now part of Ghana). In the aftermath of the abolition of the Atlantic slave trade, Daendels tried to redevelop the rather dilapidated Dutch possessions as an African plantation colony driven by legitimate trade. Drawing on his experience from the East Indies, he came up with some very ambitious infrastructural projects, including a comprehensive road system, with a main road connecting Elmina and Kumasi in Ashanti. The Dutch government gave him a free hand and a substantial budget to implement his plans. At the same time, however, Daendels regarded his governorship as an opportunity to establish a private business monopoly in the Dutch Gold Coast.

In 1817, the British accused Daendels of aiding and abetting the slave trade – which had by then been prohibited by both the British and the Dutch nations – from his position at the Elmina fort which was then under Dutch control. "We deem it our duty to inform you of the conduct of General Daendels who is acting independent of his Government", the British governor of Cape Coast, John Smith, wrote to the African Committee in Parliament in London on 5 March 1817. "Portuguese vessels are furnished with canoes, and Spaniards supplied with water. The beginning of last month a large Spanish ship was four days at anchor in Elmina roads, receiving water and bartering dollars for such goods as were suited for the purchase of slaves."

Eventually none of the plans came to fruition, as Daendels died of malaria in the castle of St. George d'Elmina, the Dutch seat of government, on 2 May 1818. His body was interred in the central tomb at the Dutch cemetery in Elmina. He had been in the country less than two years.

Awards 
 Legion of Honour

References

External links

Encyclopædia Britannica, Herman Willem Daendels

University of Harderwijk alumni

1762 births
1818 deaths
Colonial governors of the Dutch Gold Coast
Deaths from malaria
Dutch Gold Coast
18th-century Dutch lawyers
Dutch military commanders of the Napoleonic Wars
Dutch military personnel of the French Revolutionary Wars
Governors-General of the Dutch East Indies
Infectious disease deaths in Ghana
Members of the Dutch Patriots faction
People from Hattem
People of the Patriottentijd
19th-century Dutch East Indies people
18th-century Dutch military personnel